Bahattin Sofuoğlu (born 19 August 2003) is a Turkish professional motorcycle racer, being the third generation member of the Sofuoğlu family in this sport. He competes in the Supersport World Championship for MV Agusta Reparto Corse on a F3 800 RR.

Personal life
Bahattin Sofuoğlu was born on 19 August 2003, and was named after his paternal cousin Bahattin Sofuoğlu (1978–2002), who died following a crash during a motorcycle  race training.

Career
Sofuoğlu debuted internationally  in the Supersport 300 World Championship racing for the Italian Team Trasimeno on a Yamaha YZF-R3  at the Algarve International Circuit in Portugal. He started from the 34th grid among 40 racers in the seventh round of the championship on 14-16 September 2018, and placed 17th.

Racing for Biblion Motoxracing on a Yamaha YZF-R3, he finished the 2020 Supersport 300 World Championship on third place with 143 points   after ranking fourth in the second race of the last round at the Circuito do Estoril in Portugal.

He won the Super pole in the second round of 2021 Supersport 300 World Championship at Misano World Circuit Marco Simoncelli in Italy.

For the 2022 season Sofuoğlu graduated to the World Supersport Championship to ride for the MV Agusta Reparto Corse team.

Career statistics

Supersport 300 World Championship

Races by year
(key) (Races in bold indicate pole position; races in italics indicate fastest lap)

Supersport World Championship

Races by year
(key) (Races in bold indicate pole position; races in italics indicate fastest lap)

References

External links

2003 births
Living people
Sportspeople from Adapazarı
Turkish motorcycle racers
Turkish sportsmen
Sofuoğlu family
Supersport 300 World Championship riders
Supersport World Championship riders